The New Mexico Holocaust & Intolerance Museum in Albuquerque, New Mexico, was founded in 2001 by Holocaust survivor Werner Gellert and his wife, Frances Gellert, to educate people about the Holocaust as well as other genocides and forms of bullying that have affected people around the world.

In addition to the general public, the museum provides tours for schoolchildren, and offers training for teachers and school administrators about intolerance and hate prevention, and hosts monthly discussion groups.

Due to the sensitive and graphic nature of the exhibits, it has been recommended not to bring children under the age of 11 to the exhibit.

Their focus is not limited to one religion, culture, geographic area, or time.

In 2008, the museum was featured in the pilot episode of the TV show Breaking Bad, where it served as a clothing store. During that scene, Walter White attacks a group of bullies who are teasing his disabled son.

Exhibits 
Exhibits are largely the effort of Museum volunteers, and are subject to change.

Holocaust exhibits have included:
 Art of the Holocaust
 The liberation of Buchenwald
 Saving Bulgarian Jews
 Child slave labor
 The survivors of Dachau
 The rescue of the Danish Jews
 Flossenbürg slave labor
 Replica concentration camp gate
 Medical Experimentation in Nazi Germany
 Nazi memorabilia
 The Nuremberg Trials
 Photographs of rescued prisoners
 Rescuer's exhibit
 Sonia's legacy (the art of Sonja Fischerova, killed at Auschwitz on May 18, 1944)
 Holocaust stamps

Other exhibits have included:
 Media coverage of hate and intolerance
 Armenian genocide
 Greek genocide
 Native American cultural genocide
 'Tolerated' genocide in Rwanda

References

External links 

 

Holocaust museums in the United States
History museums in New Mexico
Jews and Judaism in New Mexico
Museums in Albuquerque, New Mexico